Olav Gunnarsson Helland (25 August 1875 – 30 April 1946), was a Norwegian Hardanger fiddle maker from Bø in Telemark, Norway.

He was the eldest of Gunnar Olavsson Helland's five sons, four of whom became violin makers. He showed great talent even in his younger days and worked with his father for many years.

In 1896 he settled in Notodden, Telemark, as violin maker and continued the Helland tradition of winning prizes and medals for his work. Many consider him as the greatest of his kind in the twentieth century.

See also 
 The Helland fiddle maker family

External links 
The Helland fiddle maker family

1875 births
1946 deaths
People from Bø, Telemark
People from Notodden
Norwegian musical instrument makers
Fiddle makers